Dewan Nurunnabi  is a politician from the Nilphamari District of Bangladesh and an elected a member of parliament from Nilphamari-2.

Career
Nurunnabi was elected to parliament from Nilphamari-2 as a Jatiya Party candidate in 1986 and 1988. After that he joined the Bangladesh Nationalist Party.  was elected to parliament from Nilphamari-2 as a Bangladesh Nationalist Party candidate in 15 February 1996 Bangladeshi general election.

References

Jatiya Party politicians
Living people
3rd Jatiya Sangsad members
4th Jatiya Sangsad members
Year of birth missing (living people)